Rosnaiganj is a village in the Murshidabad-Jiaganj CD block in the Lalbag subdivision of Murshidabad district in the state of West Bengal, India.

Geography

Location                           
 
The area was earlier popular as Dahpara and Farahbagh. However, as certain parts have been devoured by the Bhagirathi, parts of the existing area are known as Roshnibagh and Roshnaiganj. Roshnibagh is home to the Tomb of Sujauddin. There is a mosque known as Sujauddin's mosque. It was most likely built by Alivardi Khan after Shujauddin's death.

Demographics
According to the 2011 Census of India, Rosnaiganj had a total population of 417, of which 213 (51%) were males and 204 (49%) were females. Population in the age range 0–6 years was 40. The total number of literate persons in Rosnaiganj was 296 (78.51% of the population 6 years).

Roshnibagh Mausoleum
Shuja-ud-Din Muhammad Khan succeeded his father-in-law Murshid Quli Khan as the Nawab of Bengal in 1727 and ruled successfully till his death in 1739.

According to the List of Monuments of National Importance in West Bengal the Tomb of Sujauddin at Roshnibagh is a monument of national importance.

Roshnibagh picture gallery

References

Villages in Murshidabad district